This is a partial listing of prominent political families in Sri Lanka.

Abdul Majeed
A. L. Abdul Majeed (15 November 1933 – 13 November 1987) also known as Mutur Majeed, former Deputy Minister of Information and Broadcasting and Member Parliament from 1960–1977.
M. N. Abdul Majeed (1 January 1957 – ) Chief Minister of the Eastern Province, former Government Minister and Member of Parliament

Abeyratne
Herath Banda Abeyratne – Member of Parliament for Yapahuwa (1977–1989), former Deputy Minister of Transport, former District Minister and former Provincial Council Member and Licensed Surveyor
Abeyratne Pilapitiya (25 May 1925 – ) 3rd Governor of Uva Province, 2nd Chief Minister of Sabaragamuwa Province, Member of Parliament for Kalawana 1960, 1965, 1977–82, Deputy Minister of Posts and Telecommunications.
Abeyratne Ratnayaka – First Cabinet Minister of Food, Co-operatives and Home Affairs in independent Ceylon (now Sri Lanka) and the last President of the Senate of Ceylon, former Member of Parliament and State Council.
Pathirage Don Abeyratne (26 November 1952 – ) Member of 5th Provincial Council of Kalutara, Member of Parliament for Kalutara 1989 and 2000, Chief Organiser for Horana.
Lloyd Oscar Abeyratne – appointed member of Parliament (1960–64)
Rohana Abeyratne – Postmaster General of Sri Lanka (2012–2018)

Abeywickrama 

 Don Pedris Ferdinandus Abeywickrama
Padikara Muhandiram Don Pedris Francis Abeywickrama (28 May 1886 – 20 February 1966) writer, poet, critic and pioneer freedom fighter 
Keerthisena Abeywickrama (20 December 1933 – 18 August 1987) District Minister for Matara and Member of Parliament for Deniyaya in 1977 (UNP). Killed in the 1987 grenade attack in the Sri Lankan Parliament.
Keerthilatha Abeywickrama Member of Parliament for Deniyaya in 1987 (UNP).
Don Hendrick Abeywickrama Vidane Arachchi in Morawaka
Sumanadasa Abeywickrama (5 February 1928 – 27 February 2006) Deputy Minister of Agriculture Development & Research and Member of Parliament for Akmeemana in 1977 (UNP).

Abeywickrema
 Simon Abeywickrema (26 April 1899 – 2 May 1948) Parliamentary Secretary to the Minister of Transport. Member of State Council and Parliament, founding member of the United National Party (UNP)
 Henry Abeywickrema (24 December 1903 – 29 August 1982) Parliamentary Secretary to the Minister of Transport and Works, Minister of Works, Member of Parliament, founding member of the Sri Lanka Freedom Party (SLFP)
 Ananda Abeywickrema (24 June 1960 – ) former member of Parliament for Galle District

Aluthgamage
 S.M Aluthgamage - Nawalapitiya Electorate - Member of Parliament 1970-1977
 Mahindananda Aluthgamage - Member of parliament - 2000–present
 Ananda Aluthgamage - Member of Parliament - 2015-2019

Aluwihare
 Sir Richard Aluwihare, Inspector General of Police and Ceylon's High Commissioner to India
 Bernard Aluwihare (6 April 1902 – 22 January 1961) State Counsellor (1936–47), Member of Parliament (1952, 1960–61), Cabinet Minister
 Alick Aluwihare, (20 December 1926 – 17 May 2009) Cabinet Minister, Member of Parliament 
 Wasantha Aluwihare (16 July 1962 – ) Member of Parliament, former chief minister of Central Province, Deputy Minister. 
 Ranjith Aluwihare  (5 May 1958 – ) Member of Parliament for Matale District, former Opposition Leader, Matale Municipal Council
 Prasanna Kumara Aluwihare, Member of Pradeshiya saba Matale, former National javelin record holder / National Kabadi player / First class cricketer, Government Sports officer
 Loku Banda Aluvihare former Mayor of Kandy

Amarasuriya
Ref:
Mahendrapala Thomas de Silva Amarasuriya, Muhandiram
Henry Mahendrapala Amarasuriya Independence activist
Henry Woodward Amarasuriya, Cabinet Minister, Deputy Speaker of the Parliament and State Councillor,  founding Secretary and Vice President of the United National Party, President of Ceylon National Congress and Lanka Mahajana Sabha, educationist, Buddhist activist and philanthropist
 Thomas Amarasuriya, OBE,  Member of the State Council of Ceylon and President of the Senate of Ceylon.
 G. L. Peiris,(1946– ) Member of Parliament, Minister of External Affairs, Minister of Justice and Constitutional Affairs and Deputy Minister of Finance, Minister of External Trade, Ethnic Affairs and National Integration. [Son in law of Thomas Amarasuriya]
 Montague Jayawickrama,(1911–2001) Member of Parliament, Minister of Public Administration and Home Affairs and Governor of the North Western Province married Amara Amarasuriya [Brother in law of H.W. and Thomas Amarasuriya].

Amunugama
Sarath Amunugama, Government Minister, Member of Parliament
Dilum Amunugama, (nephew of Sarath Amunugama) Member of Parliament

Ashraff
M. H. M. Ashraff, Government Minister, Member of Parliament
 Ferial Ashraff, Government Minister, Member of Parliament and diplomat

Atapattu
Ref:
 Don Johannes Atapattu + Kadawedduwage Dona Carolina Wijekoon
 D. P. Atapattu (1899–1976), Government Minister, Member of Parliament + Daya Dahanayake
 Ranjit Atapattu Government Minister, Member of Parliament.  
 Druvindra Atapattu contestant in 2009 General Election
(also related to Dr Karunasena Kodituwakku)

Atukorale
Gamini Atukorale,(1951–2002) Government Minister, Member of Parliament
Thalatha Atukorale, Government Minister, Member of Parliament

Athulathmudali
Ref:
 Don William Athulathmudali
 Don Daniel Athulathmudali (1901–1958), Member of State Council
 Lalith Athulathmudali (1936–1993), Government Minister, Member of Parliament + Srimani Athulathmudali (1946-2004), Government Minister, Member of Parliament

Attanayake
Attanayake Mudiyanselage Jayawardena Attanayake (Member of Parliament, Moneragala District 1970 and 1994)  and Basnayake Nilame of the Ruhunu Kataragama Maha Devalaya
Senarath Attanayake Former Provincial Minister of Uva Province and current Member of Uva Provincial Council

Attygalle
Ref:
 Don Charles Gemoris Attygalle, Mudaliyar
 Alice Elizabeth Attygalle + John Kotelawala
 Sir John Kotelawala (4 April 1895 – 2 October 1980) Prime Minister of Ceylon, Cabinet Minister, member of Parliament (1947–60), Member of State Council (1931–47), Member of Legislative Council
 Justin Kotelawala (1905–1973), Senator + Millicent de Silva
 Lalith Kotelawala
 Lena Attygalle + Colonel Theodore Godfrey Wijesinghe Jayewardene (1872–1945), Member of State Council
 Ellen Attygalle + Fredrick Richard Senanayake (1882–1926), Member of Legislative Council
 Richard Gotabhaya Senanayake (4 November 1911 – 22 December 1970), Member of State Council, Cabinet Minister, Member of Parliament (1947–70)

 Sir Nicholas Attygalle - President of the Senate of Ceylon
 C. E. Attygalle - Parliamentary secretary to the Minister of Health and member of parliament

Balasuriya
 Punchi Banda Balasuriya (1907–1978), UC Chairman (1948–1967), Member of Parliament (1960–1965, 1970–1977) + Hema Balasuriya
Dr. Jagath Balasuriya, Provincial Council Member (1988–1989), Member of Parliament (1989–1994), Deputy Minister of Cooperative (1994–2000), Deputy Minister of Urban Development (2001–2002), Governor North Central (2004–2008), Deputy Minister of Labor (2010–2011), Cabinet Minister for National Heritage (2011–2015) + Kumari Balasuriya, Governor Southern Province (2008–2015)
 Tharaka Balasuriya, Member of Parliament, Provincial council member + Malintha Bolonghe Balasuriya

Bandara
 Chandra Bandara Government Minister, Member of Parliament
 Chandani Bandara, Government Minister, Member of Parliament

Bandaranaike

Ref:

 Don Francisco Dias Wijetunga Bandaranaike (1720 – ), Mudaliyar Hewagam Korale + Dona Maria Perera
 Conrad Pieter Dias Wijewardena Bandaranaike, Maha Mudliyar
 Jacabus Dias Wijewardena Bandaranaike (1780 – ), Mudaliyar of Governor Gate, Translator of Supreme Court + Liyanage Catherine Philipsz Panditharatne
 Rev Canon Samuel William Dias Bandaranaike + Cornelia Susanna Elizabeth Dias Bandaranaike
 Felix Reginold Dias Bandaranaike (1861–1947) + Annie Lucy (Florence) de Alwis (1864–1920)
 Reginald Felix Dias Bandaranaike (1891–1951), Judge of the Supreme Court + Freda Dias Abeysinghe
 Felix Dias Bandaranaike (1930–1985), Government Minister, Member of Parliament
 Don Daniel Dias Banaranaike + Dona Clara Amarasekere
 Don Solomon Dias Bandaranaike (−1859), Mudaliyar of Siyane Korale, 1st Udagaha Mudaliyar + Cornelia Philipsz Panditharatne de Saram
 Don Christoffel Henricus Dias Abeywickrema Jayatilake Seneviratne Bandaranaike (1826– ), Mudaliyar Governors Gate and 2nd Udagaha Mudaliyar + Anna Florentina Philipsz Panditharatne
 Sir Solomon Dias Bandaranaike JP (1862–1946), Maha Mudaliyar + Daisy Ezline Obeyesekere
 S. W. R. D. Bandaranaike (1899–1959), Prime Minister of Ceylon, Government Minister, Member of Parliament, Member of State Council. + Sirimavo Bandaranaike (1916–2000), Prime Minister of Ceylon, Member of Parliament, Senator
 Sunethra Bandaranaike (c. 1943– ), philanthropist  and socialite
 Chandrika Kumaratunga (1945– ), President of Sri Lanka, Prime Minister of Sri Lanka, Member of Parliament, Chief Minister of Western Province, Provincial Councillor + Vijaya Kumaratunga (1945–1988), actor and politician
 Anura Bandaranaike (1949–2008); Speaker of the Parliament of Sri Lanka, Government Minister, Member of Parliament

(also related to Ratwatte family, Ellawala family, William Gopallawa, S. D. Bandaranayake, A.R. Udugama, Panini Ilangakoon, Hector Kobbekaduwa, Jeewan Kumaranatunga, Ranjan Ramanayake)

Bakeer Markar
 Mohammed Abdul Bakeer Markar (12 May 1917 – 10 September 1997) 10th Speaker of the Parliament of Sri Lanka, Minister without Portfolio, Member of Parliament, Governor of Southern Province
 Imthiaz Bakeer Markar, (8 August 1953 ) Government Minister, Member of Parliament

Bulankulame
 Punchi Banda Bulankulame Dissawe,(12 December 1890 – 17 December 1958) Member of the State Council (1936), Member, House of Representatives, Parliamentary Secretary (Agriculture and Lands), Minister of Lands and Land Development 
(Maternal Uncle of Edwin Loku Bandara Hurulle and Granduncle of Themiya Loku Bandara Hurulle)
Deshamanya Edwin Loku Bandara Hurulle, (19 January 1919 – 6 April 2009), Member, House of Representatives, Member of Parliament, Government Minister, Governor, Central Province, High Commissioner in Australia, Governor, North Central Province (Nephew of P.B. Bulankulame Dissawe) 
 Themiya Loku Bandara Hurulle, (16 March 1952– ), Member of Parliament, Project Minister (Science and Technology), Member, North Central Provincial Council, Director-General of Telecommunications, Telecommunications Regulatory Commission of Sri Lanka (T.R.C.S.L.), Engineer (A.C.&R.) (Son of Edwin Loku Bandara Hurulle)

Cooray
 Mervyn J. Cooray (16 July 1938 – 15 January 2011) former State Minister of Power and Energy, member of Parliament
 Devapriya Cooray
 Sujith Cooray former Provincial Councilor of the Western Provincial Council, member of parliament

Coomaraswamy
Ref:
 Arumugampillai Coomaraswamy (1783–1836), Gate Mudaliyar, Member of Legislative Council
 Sir Muthu Coomaraswamy CCS FRGS (1833–1879), Member of Legislative Council + Elizabeth Clay Beeby
 Ananda Coomaraswamy (1877–1947)
 Sellachchi Coomaraswamy + A. Ponnambalam (1814–1887), Mudaliyar of the Governor's Gate
 P. Coomaraswamy (1849–1906), Member of Legislative Council
 Sir Ponnambalam Ramanathan KCMG QC (1851–1930), Solicitor General of British Ceylon, Member of Legislative Council + Leelawathy Ramanathan (1870–1953)
 Sivagamasundari + S. Natesan, Member of Parliament, Member of State Council, Senator
 Sir Ponnambalam Arunachalam KCMG CCS (1853–1924), Member of Executive Council, Member of Legislative Council< + Swarnambal Namasivayam
 Sir Arunachalam Mahadeva KCMG (1888–1969), Government Minister, Member of Legislative Council, Member of State Council, High Commissioner to India
 Balakumar (Baku) Mahadeva, (1921–2013)
 Pathmavathy Arunachalam + Sir S. Pararajasingam, Senator
 D. M. Swaminathan (1945– ), Member of Parliament, Governor of Western Province, grandson of above (also related to D. M. Swaminathan and Ulaganathar Mudaliyar of Manipay)

Corea
 Victor Corea – founder Member of the Ceylon National Congress, elected to the Legislative Council, founder Chilaw Association, President Ceylon Labour Union
Dr. C.V.S. Corea – Medical Doctor
Dr. Gamani Corea – (1974 to 1984) Under-Secretary-General of the United Nations, Ceylon's Ambassador to the EEC, Belgium, Luxembourg and the Netherlands, the Permanent Secretary of the Ministry of Planning and Economic Affairs of Ceylon and the Senior Deputy Governor of the Central Bank of Ceylon
 Charles Edgar Corea – elected to the Legislative Council, President of the Ceylon National Congress (1924), Chair/founder Chilaw Association.
 Shirley Corea, (1906–1974) Speaker of the Parliament of Ceylon, Member of Parliament for Chilaw, Minister of Commerce, Trade and Fisheries.
(Also related to)
Sir Claude Corea – Minister of Labour 1946, High Commissioner of Sri Lanka in the UK, Ceylon's Ambassador in the US, President of the United Nations Security Council, Ceylon's Ambassador at the United Nations
Harindra Corea, Deputy Foreign Minister of Sri Lanka, Member of Parliament for Chilaw
(Also related to)
Dr. Gamani Corea,  Ambassador, Secretary-General of UNCTAD, Assistant Secretary-General of the United Nations
Ernest Corea, Sri Lanka's High Commissioner to Canada, Sri Lanka's Ambassador to the United States of America
Kumari Corea, Provincial Councillor, NWP.

Dahanayake
Sumanapala Dahanayake, Member of Parliament
Wijaya Dahanayake, Deputy Minister and Member of Parliament

Dissanayake
 Andrew Dissanayake, (1910–?) Parliamentary Secretary, Member of Parliament
 Gamini Dissanayake (1942–1994), Presidential candidate (1994), Leader of the Opposition, Government Minister, Member of Parliament + Srima Dissanayake, Presidential candidate (1994)
 Navin Dissanayake (1969 – ), Government Minister, Member of Parliament
 Mayantha Dissanayake, Provincial Councillor, Member of Parliament
Karu Jayasuriya, Speaker of the Parliament, Government Minister, Member of Parliament – Father in law of Navin Dissanayake

Dissanayake
 Berty Premalal Dissanayake, Government Minister, Member of Parliament, Chief Minister of North Central Province + Jayani Tissera Dissanayake
 Duminda Dissanayake (1979 – ), Government Minister, Member of Parliament + Senani Lanka Jayaratne

De Mel
 Sir Henry De Mel, Member of the Legislative Council 
R. S. F. de Mel, Senator, Mayor of Colombo
(cousins)
 R. A. de Mel, Deputy Speaker of the Parliament
 Ronnie de Mel,(1926–) Government Minister, Member of Parliament + Mallika de Mel, Member of Parliament
(Also related to Sir Leo Fernando, Member of Parliament (father in law of Ronnie de Mel))

De Silva
 C. P. de Silva, Government Minister, Member of Parliament 
 Merril de Silva, Member of Parliament 
 A. H. de Silva, Member of Parliament 
(cousins)
 Dr Colvin R. de Silva, Government Minister, Member of Parliament 
  Manouri Muttetuwegama, Commissioner of the Human Rights Commission of Sri Lanka + Sarath Muttetuwegama, Member of Parliament (son in law of Colvin R. de Silva)

Dunuwille
 B. H. Dunuwille (1896 – ), Deputy President of the Senate, Proctor, Notary Public
 Harindra Dunuwille (1946 – ) member of Parliament, State Minister of State and Constitutional Affairs, member of Kandy Municipal Council, Mayor of Kandy and Attorney- at Law 
 D. S. Senanayake (1883–1952) 1st Prime Minister of Sri Lanka was married to Molly Dunuwille
 Dudley Senanayake (1911–1973) 2nd Prime Minister of Sri Lanka, son of Molly Dunuwille and D. S. Senanayake

Ekanayake
 T. B. Ekanayake (1954 – ), Member of Parliament -Kurunegala (1994–2000, 2001–present), Deputy Minister Education (2010–2015)
 Sarath Ekanayake – 7th and current Chief Minister of the Central Province of Sri Lanka
 Nandimithra Ekanayake – Member of Parliament (1989–2015); Chief Minister of Central Province (1999–2000); Minister of Environmental and Forest Resources (1996–1999)
 Niluka Ekanayake – Governor of Central Province (2016–present)
 E. M. R. B. Ekanayake (?-1962), Member of Parliament – Mawatagama (1960)
 S. B. Ekanayake (1906–1977), Member of Parliament – Soranatota (1960–1965)
 Herath Ekanayake (1927–1971), Member of Parliament – Mawatagama (1965–1970)

Ellawala
 William Ellawala, Member, Ceylon Legislative Council
William Ellawala Jnr
Richard Stephen Ellawala, Basnayake Nilame, Saparagamuwa Maha Saman Devalaya
 Francis Theodore Ellawala + Eslin Mahawalatenne
 Harriet Ellawala + Cyril Dangamuwa
William Theodore Ellawala, RM Nawadun Korale, Ratnapura + Millicent Dimbulana
Rohini Sita Ellawala + Seevali Ratwatte
Lakmini Ratwatte + Upali Wijewardene
Eranthika Ratwatte Kelegama + Saman Kelegama
Robert Sydney Ellawala + Mallika Kobbekaduwa
Nanda Ellawala, Member of Parliament for Ratnapura (1970–1977) + Surangani Tennekoon, Governor of the Central Province (2015—2016)
Nalanda Ellawala, Member of Parliament for Ratnapura district (1994–1997)
Mohan Ellawala, Governor of the Sabaragamuwa Province
Akila Ellawala, Provincial Council Member
Mallika Ratwatte, Member of Parliament + Clifford Ratwatte, Member of Parliament

(also related to Ratwatte family, Bandaranaike family)

Gamage (Kekirawa)
Gamage Don Mahindasoma, former Member of Parliament for Kekirawa, former chief minister of the North Central Province
Lal Dharmapriya Gamage. (nephew of G. D. Mahindasoma) former Member of Parliament for Anuradhapura district, former Minister Assisting Foreign Affairs
Chandima Gamage, Member of Parliament for Anuradhapura district

Gamage
 Daya Gamage, Member of Parliament, Government Minister
 Anoma Gamage, Member of Parliament, Government Minister

Ganesan
 V. P. Ganeshan, trade unionist, politician, film producer and actor
 Mano Ganesan (1959 – ), Member of Parliament, Provincial Councillor
 Praba Ganesan (1964 – ), Member of Parliament, Provincial Councillor

Gopallawa
Ref:
 William Gopallawa (1897–1981), Governor-General of Ceylon, President of Sri Lanka
 Monty Gopallawa (1941–2005), Government Minister, Member of Parliament + Nimal Kobbekaduwa
 Chandrika Iranganie Gopallawa + Dr Mackie Ratwatte
 Chintha Gopallawa
 Sanjeewa Hulangamuwa (1955–2013), Councillor, Kandy Municipal Council
 Devika Mediwake + Neranjan Wijeyeratne (1956– )
(also related to Ratwatte)

Gunasekara (Heiyantuduwa, Biyagama)
Tudor Gunasekara – former Member of Parliament for Mahara, former District Minister for Gampaha, former Sri Lanka ambassador to Poland, Bulgaria, Romania, and Hungary
Anuradha Dullewe Wijeyeratne – former Councillor of Sabaragamuwa Provincial Council, Ex-Acting Diyawadana Nilame of Sri Dalada Maligawa, Kandy (son-in-law of Tudor Gunasekara)

Gunasekera (Udugampola, Minuwangoda)
 Bennet Gunasekera – Member of Parliament for Minuwangoda from 1977 to 1988 
 Mahen Gunasekera  – Minister for Legal Reforms and Prison Affairs – Member of Parliament for Gampaha District (1989–1994)

Gunasekera (Ratnayake Mudiyanselage) 
 R. M. Gunasekera - Member of Parliament for Bibile 
 Ranjith Madduma Bandara - Minister and Member of Parliament 
 Dharmadasa Banda - Member of Parliament for Bibile

Gunawardena (Boralugoda Ralahamy)
Ref:
 Don Jacolis Rupasinghe Gunawardena (1879–1947) + Leonora
 Philip Gunawardena (1901–1972), Government Minister, Member of Parliament, Member of State Council The 'Father of Socialism in Sri Lanka', first person to call for Independence in Sri Lanka + Kusumasiri Amarasinghe (1912–1985) Member of Parliament
 Indika Gunawardena, Government Minister, Member of Parliament
 Prasanna Gunawardena, Mayor of Colombo, Presidential adviser
 Dinesh Gunawardena (1949 – ), Prime Minister of Sri Lanka, Cabinet Minister and Member of Parliament 
 Yadamini Gunawardena, Member of Parliament + Samanmali Sakalasooriya, Provincial Councillor 
 Gitanjana Gunawardena (1952 – ), Government Minister, Member of Parliament
 Robert Gunawardena (1904–1971), Member of Parliament, Ambassador to Beijing, 1965–1970
 Caroline Gunawardena + S. C. C. Anthonypillai (Tony), Trade Unionist, Member of the Lok Sabha
 Emily Angeline Gunawardena + Dr Don Allenson Goonetilleke
 Vivienne Goonewardena (1916–1996), Member of Parliament, Minister of Health + Leslie Goonewardena, Member of Parliament and Minister of Transport, founding father of the LSSP

Gunewardane
 Lionel Gunewardena, Deputy Minister 
Sarana Gunewardane, Deputy Minister, Member of Parliament, Provincial Councillor
Chandrika Gunewardane, Provincial Councillor + Sardhatissa Sakalasuriya, Member of Parliament, Provincial Council Chairman
Lakshman Gunewardane, Urban Councillor

Hewavitarne-Moonesinghe
Ref:
 Andiris Perera Dharmagunawardhana (1809–1890), President of the Buddhist Theosophical Society, founder President of the Buddhism Protection Committee, founder of the Vidyodaya Pirivena and a leader of the Buddhist revival in Sri Lanka
 Mallika Dharmagunawardhana (1846–1936), President Women's Education Society + Don Carolis Hewavitarne (1833–1906) founder member of Buddhist Theosophical Society, founder member of the Buddhist Defence Committee and a leader of the Buddhist revival in Sri Lanka
 Anagarika Dharmapala (Don David Hewavitarne) (1864–1933), Leader of the Buddhist revival movement
 Dona Engeltina Hewavitarne (1865–1902) + Jacob Moonesinghe, a leader of the Buddhist revival movement
 Sanath Moonesinghe
 Mangala Moonesinghe, Member of Parliament, High Commissioner to India and UK
 Piyadas Moonesinghe (1896–1969) + Beatrice Wijegoonewardena de Silva Senanayaka (1900–1989)
 Anil Moonesinghe (1927–2002), Deputy Speaker, Minister of Communications, Member of Parliament, trade unionist, Ambassador in Vienna
 Susil Moonesinghe (1930–2012), first Chief Minister of the Western Province, Member of Parliament, Ambassador in Tehran
 Edmund Hewavitarne (1870–1915), convicted of treason, died in British custody  + Sujatha Peiris
 Raja Hewavitarne, OBE (1898–1958), Member of State Council Matara, Minister of Labour, Industry and Commerce
 Neil Kamal Hewavitarne (1904–1939), Member of State Council Udugama
 Sumanadevi Hewavitarne + Jayasuriya
 Gamini Jayasuriya (1924–1998)Cabinet Minister and Member of Parliament Homagama
 Dr Charles Alwis Hewavitarne (1876–1929), leader in the Buddhist revival movement

Hurulle
 Edwin Loku Bandara Hurulle, (1919–2009), Member, House of Representatives, Member of Parliament, Government Minister, Governor (Central Province), High Commissioner in Australia, Governor (North Central Province). 
 Themiya Loku Bandara Hurulle (1952 – ), Member of Parliament, Project Minister (Science and Technology), Member,(North Central Provincial Council), Director-General, Telecommunications Regulatory Commission of Sri Lanka (T.R.C.S.L.), Engineer (AC&R)
 Punchi Banda Bulankulame Dissawe, Member of the State Council (1936), Member, House of Representatives, Parliamentary Secretary (Agriculture), Minister of Lands and Land Development, Proctor, Notary Public and Captain (Cricket ),1919–1920, St.Thomas’ College, Mt.Lavinia(Maternal Uncle of Edwin Loku Bandara Hurulle and Granduncle of Themiya Loku Bandara Hurulle)
 Harindra Dunuwille (1946 – ), Member of Parliament, State Minister of State and Constitutional Affairs, Member, Kandy Municipal Council, Mayor of Kandy, Attorney at Law (son-in-law of E. L. B. Hurulle)

Ilangaratne
 T. B. Ilangaratne (1913–1992), Government Minister, Member of Parliament + Tamara Kumari Ilangaratne, Member of Parliament (Kandy)

Jayewardene
Ref:
 Tombi Mudaliyar Don Adrian Wijesinghe Jayewardene (1768–1830) A descendant of a Colombo Chetty originally from Coromandel Coast of India who married into a Sinhalese family called Jayewardene; conspired with the British to overthrow the last King of Kandy
Mudaliyar Don Abraham Wijesinghe Jayewardene (1801–1866)
 James Alfred Jayewardene (c. 1845 – 1888), Deputy Coroner of Colombo + Cornelia Matilda Wijekoon
Hector Alfred Jayewardene, (1870–1913), member of the Colombo Municipal Council
 Colonel T. G. Jayewardene (1872–1945), Member of State Council + Lena Attygalle
 Major T. F. Jayewardene, Member of Parliament 
 Margie Jayewardene + A. F. Wijemanne, Minister of Justice and Member of the Senate
 Justice Eugene Wilfred Jayewardene, KC (1874–1932), Chief Justice + Agnes Helen Don Philip Wijewardene
J. R. Jayewardene (1906–1996), President of Sri Lanka, Prime Minister of Sri Lanka, Government Minister, Member of Parliament, Member of State Council 
 Captain Ravi Jayewardene (1936 - 2017), National Security Adviser
 Pradeep Jayewardene, Member of Colombo Municiple Council
 Hector Wilfred Jayewardene, QC (1916–1990), Member at the United Nations Commission on Human Rights
John Adrian St. Valentine Jayewardene (1877–1927), Judge of the Supreme Court of Ceylon
 Clodagh Jayasuriya, Member of Parliament + Bernard Jayasuriya, Member of State Council

Jayaratne
 S. D. R. Jayaratne, Government Deputy Minister (1931 - 2008) (Former Deputy Minister of Fisheries and Minister of Fisheries) and Member of Parliament for Chilaw(1960 to 2000)
 Piyankara Jayaratne (1964- ),Forigen Employment Development Minister, Civil Aviation Minister (former Deputy Speaker/ former State Minister law and Order, former State Minister Local Government, former State Minister Indigenous Medicine), former Deputy Minister Youth Affairs and Member of Parliament

Jayaratne (Doluwa, Gampola)
D. M. Jayaratne, former prime minister of Sri Lanka
Anuradha Jayaratne, Deputy Minister, Member of Parliament, Provincial Councillor
Hon. Jayarathne's daughter had married to Duminda Dissanayake, government minister. After the broken of the marriage the daughter has married Mahindananda Aluthgamage, government minister.

Jayatilaka
Robert Edward Jayatilaka, Former Government Minister,  Member of Parliament, Member of State Council. + Effie Jayatilaka, Former Chairman – Nawalapitiya Urban Council (sister of Edmund Samarakkody and first wife of Panini Ilangakoon)
(Grand daughter) Anarkali Akarsha, Former Provincial Councillor, Southern Province

Kariapper
Ref:
 Marikkar Vedarala 
 Haji Marikkar Muhandiram – Dissawa of Wellassa, d:1817
 Neina Marikkar 
 Ahamedu Lebbe Kariapper 
 Abdul Kareem Kariapper – Notary JP (Vanniah of Eravur Pattu and Koralai Pattu- circa 1912) 
 Hanoon Kariapper d:1952 + M. I. Abdul Rasool Mudali of Trincomalee
 2nd spouse of Hanoon Kariapper (the widow of M.I. Abdul Rasool) + M. A. M. Hussain, District Judge, d:2000
 Dr. Mohamed Ibrahim Kariapper – LAILATHUL KATHIRIYA KARIAPPER
 M. S. Kariapper (1899–1989), Gate Mudaliyar, Member of Parliament
 Subeitha Zohara MS Kariapper + A. R. Mansoor, Member of Parliament, Former Government Minister and Former Sri Lankan ambassador to the State of Kuwait and the Kingdom of Bahrain
 Shahida MS Kariapper + M. M. Musthafa, Government Minister, Member of Parliament
 MADANIYA Dr. Mohamed Ibrahim Kariapper + Mohamed Cassim Kariapper 
 M.C. Ahamed, Member of Parliament Kalmunai 1960–1977), d: 3 July 2008
 Zainabu Natchiar Kariapper + Mohamed Meera Lebbe
 Mohammed Meera Lebbe Hussain + Matheena Ummah
 M. H. M. Ashraff (1948–2000), founder and leader of the Sri Lanka Muslim Congress, Government Minister, Member of Parliament  + Ferial Ismail Ashraff (1953 – ), Government Minister, Member of Parliament
 Khatheeja Kos Mohamed Notaris bin Ibra Lebbe Kariapper + [200] Abdul Latheef Kariapper (had 13 children of which 1 died in infancy, 1 died in early youth) 
 Abdul Kareem Kariapper + MAriyam Nachi Selapullai Udayar(from Ninthavur)
 Zohara (Nona) AK Kariapper + Advocate Samsudeen Member of Parliament, former Sri Lankan Ambassador to UAE
 Ariff Samsudeen Attorney-at-Law (1972) – Member of Eastern Provincial Council

Karunathilake
Rupa Karunathilake, Government Minister, Member of Parliament
Gayantha Karunathilaka, (nephew of Rupa Karunathilake) Government Minister, Member of Parliament 
Sanjeev Karunathilaka,  Provincial Councillor, Southern Province

Keerthiratne-Karunaratne
 N. H. Keerthiratne, (1902–1992), Government Minister, Member of Parliament
 Asoka Karunaratne (1916–1988), Government Minister, Member of Parliament
 Samantha Karunaratne, Government Minister, Member of Parliament

Kotelawala
 Don Manuel Kotelawala from Undugoda, Bandaragama
 Don A Kotelawala
John Kotelawala Sr, Inspector of Ceylon Police Force + Alice Elisabeth Kotelawala
Sir John Kotelawala, Third Prime Minister of Ceylon and Privy Councilor
Justin Kotelawala, Senator 
Lalith Kotelawala 
Freda Corea, Sister of Sir John and Justin Kotelawala 
Dr. Gamani Corea – (1974 to 1984) Under-Secretary-General of the United Nations, Ceylon's Ambassador to the EEC, Belgium, Luxembourg and the Netherlands, the Permanent Secretary of the Ministry of Planning and Economic Affairs of Ceylon and the Senior Deputy Governor of the Central Bank of Ceylon
 D.C. Kotelawala, Muhandiram
 Sir Henry Kotelawala, Member of the Legislative Council and State Council (Uva)
Jack Kotelawala, Member of the State Council and Parliament
Gladwin Kotelawala, Member of Parliament (Uva)
(Cousins)
 George L. Kotelawala, (1922–1971) Member of Parliament (Bandaragama)

Kumaratunga
Sydney Kumaratunga
Jeewan Kumaranatunga, Cabinet Minister, Member of Parliament  
Malsha Kumaratunga, Western Province Council Member
Vijaya Kumaratunga + Chandrika Kumaratunga, President of Sri Lanka, Prime Minister of Sri Lanka

Lokubandara
 W. J. M. Lokubandara (1941 – 2021), Speaker of the Parliament of Sri Lanka, Government Minister, Member of Parliament, Governor of Sabaragamuwa Province 
 Udith Lokubandara (1984 – ), Member of Parliament

Macan Markar
Sir Mohamed Macan Markar (1885–1969), Minister of Home Affaires of the State Council, Member of the Legislative Council and Senator.
Ahmed Hussain Macan Markar (1893–1984), Member of parliament and Deputy Mayor of Colombo.

Mallimaratchi
 Weerasinghe Mallimarachchi (1929 – ), Minister of Food, Co-operatives and Janasaviya (Poverty Alleviation) Minister of Petroleum Services, State Minister of Industry, District Minister of Colombo Member Of Parliament 1977 – 1994
 Jayantha Mallimaratchi (1955–1989), Member of Colombo Municipal Council 1978–1989
 Janaka Mallimaratchi, Member of Western Provincial Council 1993 – 2009

Mathew
 Edley Winston Mathew (27 January 1907 – ) MBE, Member of the House of Representatives for Balangoda 
 Cyril Mathew (1912–1989), Government Minister, Member of Parliament
 Nanda Mathew, Government Minister, Member of Parliament, Governor of Uva Province
 S.S Kulatileke, Government Minister, Member of Parliament (father in law of Nanda Mathew)

Mendis
 Mudaliyar Thenahandi David Mendis (1904–1977) – Mayor of Negombo (1965-1970)
 Thenahandi Wijayapala Mendis (1928–2012) – Government Minister, Member of Parliament, Mayor of Negombo, Minister of Textile Industries (1977–89), Minister of Transport and Highways (1989–1994), Leader of the House (1993–4), Chief Opposition Whip (1994–98)
 Thenahandi Nandana Mendis – Chief Minister Western Province
 Thenahandi Davindra Sethwijaya Mendis – Provincial Councillor, Western Province [son of T Wijayapala Mendis]
Nevil de Silva - Deputy Mayor of Negombo [brother-in-law of T. Wijayapala Mendis]
Prof. Kamal Karunanayake (1937-2006) Member of Parliament [brother-in-law of T. Wijayapala Mendis]

Molamure
Sir Francis Molamure, first Speaker of Parliament + Lady Adeline Meedeniya, Member of State Council of Ceylon and Senate (Daughter of J. H. Meedeniya Adigar, Member of the Legislative Council)
 Seetha Molamure, Member of the Senate of Ceylon
 A. F. Molamure (nephew of Sir Francis Molamure), Member of Parliament

Moulana
 Seyed Alavi Moulana, Government Minister, Member of Parliament, Governor of Western Province.
 Seyed Ali Zahir Moulana (1956 – ), Government Minister, Member of Parliament (1994–2004, 2015– ), Diplomat, Senior Adviser to the Prime Minister. Played a pivotal role that brought about the end of the Sri Lankan Civil War.

Muhammedh
Ref:

Mathicham Saleem Lebbe Muhammedh Thamby Vidane alias Muhammedh Vidane (1819–1879) + Amina (1827–1899) of Negombo – He succeeded his father as the Vidane (Village Headman) for part of Negombo (assumed to be for Udayar Toppu area) somewhere around mid 1800AD 
Meena Muhammedh Thamby + Name not known
Yoosoof Lebbe Vidane of Negombo 
Yoosoof Lebbe Mubarak Vidane of Negombo – He succeeded his father as the Vidane 
Omardeen Police Vidane(d 1921)of Negombo
Omardeen Abdul Wahab Vidane
Muhammedh Thamby Samsudheen Vidane Arachchi alias Dheen Arachchi (1860–1915) + Hafsa Marikar (1870–1950) of Negombo – He was appointed as the  "Vidane Arachchi " for Negombo in Eighteen Ninety Six (1896)
Fathima Zuhara Dheen (1893–1967) + Abdulla Court Mudliyar (d 1944)
Safa Abdulla (1914–2007) + Hussain Sheik Ismail Proctor (1901–1974) of Putlam – He entered the field of politics in 1928 when he became a member of the Puttalam Local Board. He was elected as a member of the Puttalam Urban Development Council In 1933. He became its chairman in 1938 and served in that post without a break until 1947. At the first Parliamentary elections which was held in 1947, he was elected uncontested and thus holding the distinction of being referred to as the First Member of the First Independent Parliament of Ceylon. He was appointed as Parliamentary Secretary to the Minister of Food and Co-operatives under the Govt. of Rt. Hon D.S. Senanayake. As a Deputy Minister of food and Co-operatives (1947–1948) he managed to open a large number of Co-operative Societies all over the country. Later on he was elected as the Deputy Chairman of Committees and subsequently, had the distinction of being elected as Deputy Speaker of the House of Representatives. The culmination of Proctor Ismail's political career came when he was unanimously elected as the speaker in 1956, thus creating another first in the annals of Sri Lankan political history; the first Muslim speaker of the parliament of Ceylon (1956–1959)
M. Abdulla Thaha (1915–1969) + Kadheeja (1934–1989) – Member of Negombo Urban Council (1944–1949)
Abdulla Abdul Rahman Proctor (1921–1998)+ Hamzathul Inaya Abdul Raheeman (1927) 
Fahima Abdul Rahman (1951) + Sheriff Sabry (1940–2008) of Ratmalana – He was the first Muslim to be appointed as the Auditor General (1993–2000) of Sri Lanka 
Ummu Aimun Abdulla (1923–2000) + Anis Sheriff JP – He was the first Muslim to be the Deputy Mayor of Negombo Municipal Council and was also a member of the Western Provincial Council.
Ismail Dheen Proctor JP (1894–1968) + Hameeda Habeeblebbe (d 1970) – He was the first Muslim to qualify as a Lawyer in Negombo and was also the Quazi for Negombo 
Samsudheen Abdul Raheeman Proctor JPUM (1896–1965) + Rahma Abdul Azeez (1910–2002) – He was the only Muslim to be the Chairman (1941–1944) of the then Negombo Urban Council. 
Shareefa Dheen (1897–1986) + Haneefa
Haneefa Cafoor (1916–1970) + Jezima Muhammed (d 2001)
Aleema Cafoor (1947) + Farook (1937–1996) of Mawanella – He was a Member of the Sabaragamuwa Provincial Council at the time of his death
Haneefa Mahroof Proctor JPUM (1919–1990) + Hamzackiya Abdul Raheeman (1931) – He was a member of the Negombo Municipal Council 
Faleela Dheen (1901–1982) + Thamby Lebbe Abdul Hameed (1894–1959)
Sithy Rahma Abdul Hameed (1929–2006) + Abdul Raheem Rafeek JP (1927–1989)
Fariha Rafeek (1955) + Caesar Reyan Hassan (1947–2015) of Katugastota – He obtained the highest number of preferential votes for the Pathadumbara Electorate during the local government elections held in Nineteen ninety-one (1991) and thereby became the first Muslim to be the Vice Chairman of the Pathadumbara Pradeshiya Sabava
Shums Ruquiya Dheen (1905–1958) + Ali Abul Hassen JP (1903–1997)
Hafeela Hassen (1931) + Cassim Proctor JPUM (1923–1985)
Ajward Cassim (1955–1995) + Lilyana (1955) – (Migrated to Yugoslavia in 1980s) He was appointed as the Honorary Counsel General of Sri Lanka for Yugoslavia and held this post until his death. 
Muhammedh Thamby Sinna Lebbe Marikar + Name not known
Marikar Abdul Razak Vidane of Negombo

Nanayakkara
 D. Francis Nanayakkara + Irene Nanayakkara (1917–2010)
 Vasudeva Nanayakkara (1939– ), Government Minister, Member of Parliament + Wasanthi Nanayakkara (Lawyer)
 Yasapalitha Nanayakkara (1940–1996), Provincial Councillor, Film Director + Manoshri Perera Nanayakkara
 Hemakumara Nanayakkara, Government Minister, Member of Parliament

Nugawela
 Punchi Banda Nugawela, Member of State Council 
 Major E. A. Nugawela, Government Minister, Member of Parliament, Member of State Council

Obeyesekere
 Don Bastian Ferdinandus Wijesiri Guneratne Obeyesekere, Mudaliyar of Talpepattu
 Sir Solomon Christoffel Obeyesekere, Unofficial Member of the Legislative Council of Ceylon
 Sir Forester Obeysekera, Speaker of the State Council of Ceylon and a member of the Legislative Council of Ceylon
 James Peter Obeyesekere I - Maha Mudaliyar
 Sir James Peter Obeyesekere II - Maha Mudaliyar
 James Peter Obeyesekere III – Politician, Senator, Government Minister + Sivagami Obeyesekere – Politician, Government Minister, Member of Parliament

(also related to Bandaranaike)

Pathirana
Ref:

Richard Pathirana – Cabinet minister for Education and Higher Education (1994 to 2000) and State Administration and Home Affairs (2000–01)
Ramesh Pathirana – Member of the Parliament of Sri Lanka for Galle district

Panabokke
Tikiri Bandara Panabokke I – Member of the Legislative Council of Ceylon
Sir Tikiri Bandara Panabokke II –  Minister of Health in the State Council of Ceylon 
Theodore Braybrooke Panabokke – Deputy Minister of Justice and Agriculture

Perera
 Festus Perera, Government Minister, Member of Parliament + Larine Perera Member of Parliament, Provincial Minister, Provincial Councillor
 Niroshan Perera, Member of Parliament and State Minister of Youth Affairs

Premachandra
Bharatha Lakshman Premachandra,  Provincial Councillor, Member of Parliament
Hirunika Premachandra, Provincial Councillor, Member of Parliament

Ponnambalam
 G. G. Ponnambalam KC (1901–1977), founder and leader of the All Ceylon Tamil Congress, Government Minister, Member of Parliament, Member of State Council
 Kumar Ponnambalam (1940–2000), leader of the All Ceylon Tamil Congress, presidential candidate (1982)
 Gajendrakumar Ponnambalam (1974– ), leader of the All Ceylon Tamil Congress, Member of Parliament

Premadasa
 Ranasinghe Premadasa (1924–1993), President of Sri Lanka, Prime Minister of Sri Lanka, Government Minister, Member of Parliament + Hema Wickrematunge
Sajith Premadasa (1967 – ), Leader of the Opposition, Government Minister, Member of Parliament

Rajakaruna
 Sarathchandra Rajakaruna, Government Minister, Member of Parliament, Businessmen
 Harshana Rajakaruna, Member of Parliament, Businessmen

Rajapaksa

Ref:

 Don David Rajapaksa, Vidane Arachchi
 Don M Rajapaksa, Member of State Council, Senator
 Lakshman Rajapaksa, Member of Parliament
 George Rajapaksa, Government Minister, Member of Parliament
 Shyamlal Rajapaksa, Provincial Councilor
 Nirupama Rajapaksa (1962– ), Government Minister, Member of Parliament 
 D. A. Rajapaksa (1905–1967), Government Minister, Member of Parliament + Dandina Samarasinghe Dissanayake
 Chamal Rajapaksa (1942– ), Speaker of the Parliament of Sri Lanka, Government Minister, Member of Parliament + Malini Rajapaksa
 Shasheendra Rajapaksa (1976– ), Chief Minister of Uva Province, Provincial Councillor, Basnayake Nilame of the Ruhunu Kataragama Maha Devalaya
 Mahinda Rajapaksa (1945–), 6th President of Sri Lanka, Prime Minister of Sri Lanka, Government Minister, Member of Parliament  + Shiranthi Rajapaksa
 Namal Rajapaksa (1986– ), Minister of Sports and Member of Parliament
 Yoshitha Rajapaksa (1988– ), Prime Minister's Chief of Staff
 Gotabhaya Rajapaksa (1949– ), 8th President of Sri Lanka, Secretary to the Ministry of Defence and Urban Development + Ioma Rajapaksa
 Basil Rajapaksa (1951– ), Minister of Finance, Member of Parliament

Ranatunga
 Reggie Ranatunga, Government Minister, Member of Parliament, Governor of Sabaragamuwa Province
 Arjuna Ranatunga (1963– ), Government Minister, Member of Parliament
 Prasanna Ranatunga (1967– ), Chief Minister of Western Province, Member of Parliament
 Ruwan Ranatunga (1971– ), Member of Parliament

Ratnayaka
 S. W. D. Ratnayake – Member of Parliament
 Sarath Sepala Ratnayake – Assassinated Parliamentary Candidate (22 January 1989)
 Victor Garvin Weerawardana Ratnayake, Member of Parliament
Sagala Ratnayaka, Government Minister, Member of Parliament

Ratwatte
Ref:

 Wijayawardena Senevirat Panditha Wahala Mudiyanse
 Panditha Wahala Mudiyanse Ralahamy Ratwatte + Loku Kumarihamy Ratwatte
Loku Nilame Adikaram Ratwatte, 2nd Adigar and Dissawa of Matale+ Meegastenne Amunugama Medduma Kumarihamy
 Seneviratne Nilame Ratwatte (1827–?) + Amunugama Meegastenne Medduma Kumarihamy
 Punchi Menika Ratwatte Kumarihamy + Paranagama Loku Mudiyanse
 Abeyratne Banda Ratwatte Basnayake + Thalgahagoda Lewke Punchi Kumarihamy
 Sir Cuda Ratwatte Adigar, First Mayor of Kandy.
 A. C. L. Ratwatte, Mayor of Kandy
 J. C. Ratwatte Adigar, Member of State Council + Phyllis Sita Aluvihare
 Charitha Ratwatte, Chairmen of the United National Party 
 Barnes Ratwatte Dissawe (1883–1957), Rate Mahattaya and Dissava of Sabaragamuwa, Senator + Rosalind Mahawelatenne Kumarihamy
Sirimavo Bandaranaike (1916–2000), Prime Minister of Ceylon, Member of Parliament, Senator + S. W. R. D. Bandaranaike (1899–1959), Prime Minister of Ceylon, Government Minister, Member of Parliament, Member of State Council
 Sunethra Bandaranaike (c. 1943– ), politician and socialiteref>Sunethra Bandaranaike </ref>
 Chandrika Kumaratunga (1945– ), President of Sri Lanka, Prime Minister of Sri Lanka, Member of Parliament, Chief Minister of Western Province, Provincial Councillor + Vijaya Kumaratunga (1945–1988), actor and politician
 Anura Bandaranaike (1949–2008), Speaker of the Parliament of Sri Lanka, Government Minister, Member of Parliament
 Dr Mackie Ratwatte, Prime Minister's Private Secretary  + Chandrika Iranganie Gopallawa
 Clifford Ratwatte (1927–2009), Member of Parliament 
Kamal Ratwatte
Heshani Ratwatte
 Harris Leuke Ratwatte (1900–1964), Diyawadana Nilame of the Sri Dalada Maligawa, Member of Parliament, Senator 
 General Anuruddha Ratwatte, Acting Diyawadana Nilame of the Sri Dalada Maligawa, Government Minister, Member of Parliament
 Lohan Ratwatte (1968– ), Member of Parliament, Provincial Councillor
 Mahendra Ratwatte, Basnayake Nilame of the Sri Maha Vishnu Devalaya of Kandy, Dedi Munda Devalaya of Aluthnuwara, Mayor of Kandy. 
(also related to the Bandaranaike family, William Gopallawa, A.R. Udugama, Hector Kobbekaduwa)

Sakalasuriya
 Sardhatissa Sakalasuriya, member of parliament, chairman of Provincial Council + Chandrika Sakalasuriya, Provincial Councillor
Samanmalee Sakalasuriya, Provincial Councillor

Samarakkody
 Edmund Samarakkody, Member of Parliament
 Stephen Samarakkody, Member of Parliament
 Siripala Samarakkody, Member of Parliament
 Panini Ilangakoon, Member of Parliament (brother-in-law)
 Robert Edward Jayatilaka, Member of Parliament (brother-in-law)

Samaraweera
 Mahanama Samaraweera, Government Minister, Member of Parliament+ Khema Samaraweera, member of the Matara Urban Council
 Mangala Samaraweera (1956– 2021), Government Minister, Member of Parliament

Samaraweera
 Percy Samaraweera, Chief Minister of Uva
 Upali Samaraweera,  Minister of Uva 
 Ravindra Samaraweera, Government Minister, Member of Parliament

Sangarapillai
Ref:

 A. V. Sangarapillai, Founder of Manipay Hindu College
 Sir S. Pararajasingam, Senator + Pathmavathy Arunachalam
 Lalithambikai (−2005) + M. Swaminathan
 D. M. Swaminathan (1945– ), Member of Parliament, Governor of Western Province

(also related to Coomaraswamy, Ulaganathar Mudaliyar of Manipay)

Saravanamuttu
Sir Ratnasothy Saravanamuttu,  first elected Ceylonese Mayor of Colombo, Member of the State Council + Naysum Saravanamuttu, Member of the State Council
Lieutenant Colonel S. Saravanamuttu, Member of the Colombo Municipal Council

Sinne Lebbe
 Mudaliar Ahamed Lebbe Sinne Lebbe (b.1902), Member of Parliament
 Abdul Lathiff Sinnalebbe, Member of Parliament
 Ahamed Rizvi Sinnalebbe (1959–2001), Member of Parliament

Senadheera
Bandulahewa Senadheera, Member of Parliament + Daya Sepali Senadheera, Member of Parliament, assassinated by the JVP

Senanayake
Ref:

 Don Bartholomew Senanayake
 Don Spater Senanayake (1848–1907), Mudaliyar   + Dona Catherina Elizabeth Perera Gunasekera Senanayake (1848–?)
 Don Charles Senanayake (1878–1931) + Euphemia Grace Millicent
 Ivy Senanayake (1911–1984) + Dr Edmond Asoka Bulankulame (1900–1978)
 Visakha Bulankulame (1935–1999) + Tissa Wijeyeratne (1923–2002)
 Fredrick Richard Senanayake (1882–1926), Member of Legislative Council and independence activist  + Ellen Attygalle
 Richard Gotabhaya Senanayake (1911–1970) Government Minister, Member of Parliament 
 Don Stephen Senanayake (1884–1952), Prime Minister of Ceylon, Member of Parliament, Member of State Council, Member of Legislative Council
 Dudley Senanayake (1911–1973), Prime Minister of Ceylon, Government Minister, Member of Parliament
 Robert Parakrama Senanayake (1913–1986)
 Ranjani Senanayake + Ranjith Wijewardene
 Ruwan Wijewardene (1975– ), Cabinet Minister and Member of Parliament 
 Rukman Senanayake (1948– ), Assistant Leader of United National Party, Government Minister, Member of Parliament
 Ranjit Senanayake + Suwanitha
 Vasantha Senanayake (1973– ), Member of Parliament 

(also related to Sir John Lionel Kotelawala, Junius Richard Jayewardene, Ranjan Wijeratne and Ranil Wickremesinghe)

Senewiratne
 Captain C. P. J. Senewiratne, Government Minister, Member of Parliament
 Lakshman Senewiratne (1957– ), Government Minister, Member of Parliament
Buddhika P. Senevirathne

Senaratne
Rajitha Senaratne, Government Minister, Member of Parliament
Chathura Senarathne, Member of the Parliament

Tissera
 Protus Tissera, member of parliament (Nattandiya 1970-1977), provincial council member (north western province) 1988-1993
 Dayasritha Tissera, member of parliament (Puttalam 2001-2004), Deputy minister 2004-2007, non-cabinet minister skills development 2007-2010, cabinet minister state development 2010-2015, provincial council member (north western province) 1999-2000
 Sumal Tissera, nattandiya pradesiya sabha opposition leader 2002-2004, provincial Council member (north western province) 2004-2008, provincial Council Minister (north western province) 2008-2020

Tennakoon
 T. B. Tennakoon, Government Minister, Member of Parliament
 Yasaratne Tennakoon, Member of Parliament, Adviser to the Prime Minister
 Tilina Tennakoon, Member of Parliament
 Janaka Bandara Tennakoon (1953– ), Government Minister, Member of Parliament
 Pramitha Bandara Tennakoon, Provincial Council Minister – Central Province

Tennakoon
 Mudiyanse Tennakoon, Member of Parliament
 Soma Kumari Tennakoon, Member of Parliament

Tambimuttu
 E. R. Tambimuttu
 Sam Tambimuttu, Member of Parliament
 Arun Tambimuttu

Thondaman
 V. E. K. R. Karuppaiah (Kumaravel) + Sithammai
 Savumiamoorthy Thondaman (1913–1999), founder and leader of the Ceylon Workers' Congress, Government Minister, Member of Parliament + Kothai
 Ramanathan Thondaman
 Arumugam Thondaman (1964 - 2020), leader of the Ceylon Workers' Congress, Government Minister, Member of Parliament + Rajalakshmi
Jeewan Thondaman (1994-) Government Minister, Member of Parliament 
(Cousins)
Senthil Thondaman, Former Uva Provincial Council Minister

Ulaganathar of Manipay
Ref:

Madava Mudaliyar (Birth between 1580 – 1600)

Kathirkama Mudali 
 Ulaganathar Mudaliyar of Manipay 1664
 Ulaganathar Mathar Mudaliyar 
 Mathar Kathirgamakanakkar 
 Kathirgamakanakkar Thillaiampalam 
 Thillaiampalam Arunachalam, Mudaliyar 
 A. Ponnambalam (1814–1887), Mudaliyar of the Governor's Gate + Sellachchi Coomaraswamy
 P. Coomaraswamy (1849–1906), Member of Legislative Council
 Sir Ponnambalam Ramanathan KCMG QC (1851–1930), Solicitor General of British Ceylon, Member of Legislative Council + Sellachchi Ammal + Leelawathy Ramanathan (1870–1953)
 Rajendra 
 Srimani + Sangarapillai Pathmanathan
 Deshamanya Justice P. Ramanathan (1932–2006) – Supreme Court judge, Governor of Western Province
 Sivagamasundari + S. Natesan, Member of Parliament, Member of State Council, Senator
 Sir Ponnambalam Arunachalam KCMG CCS (1853–1924), Member of Executive Council, Member of Legislative Council + Swarnambal Namasivayam
 Arunachalam Padmanabha
 Sir Arunachalam Mahadeva KCMG (1888–1969), Government Minister, Member of Legislative Council, Member of State Council, High Commissioner to India
 Balakumar (Baku) Mahadeva (1921–2013)
 Arunachalam Ramanathan
 Pathmavathy Arunachalam + Sir S. Pararajasingam, Senator
 Pararajasingham Nadesan
 Lalithambikai (−2005) + M. Swaminathan
 D. M. Swaminathan (1945– ), Member of Parliament, Governor of Western Province

(also related to Coomaraswamy)

Viswanather-Arumugam-Cathiravelu
 Vinayakar Viswanather
 Viswanather Arumugam
 Arumugam Canagaratnam, Member of Legislative Council
 Arumugam Cathiravelu, Magistrate and District Judge
 Cathiravelu Sittampalam CCS (1898–1964), Government Minister,  Member of Parliament
 Cathiravelu Ponnambalam, first mayor of Jaffna
 Viswanather Casipillai, Crown Proctor

Wanniarachchi
 Dharmadasa Wanniarachchi, Government Minister, Member of Parliament, Governor of North Western Province
 Pavithra Devi Wanniarachchi (1964– ), Government Minister, Member of Parliament + Kanchana Jayaratne, Chairman, Sabaragamuwa Provincial Council
 W A Karunasena, Member of Parliament (1960–67)

Wickremesinghe
 D. P. Wickremasinghe, Government Minister, Member of Parliament
 Neranjan Wickremasinghe, Deputy Minister, Member of Parliament

Abeywardena Wickramasinghe
 Dr. S.A. Wickramasinghe is the first leftist member to elect to the State council in 1931 in Sri Lanka. Dr. S.A. Wickramasinghe represent the state council and Parliament since 1931–1977.
 W.P.A. Wickramasinghe member of parliament in Sri Lanka's first ever Parliament in 1947. 
 Doreen Wickramasinghe member of parliament 1951–1956.
 Dayananda. A. Wickramasinghe member of parliament and Minister of United National Party Government in 1977–1994.
 Percy Wickramasinghe member of parliament 1970–1977

Welagedara
 Dingiri Bandara (D.B) Welagedara (1915–1989), Government Minister, Member of Parliament, Governor of North Central Province
 Sarath Welagedara, (1946– ) State Minister, Member of Parliament

Wickremanayake
 Ratnasiri Wickremanayake (1933–2016), Prime Minister of Sri Lanka, Government Minister, Member of Parliament
 Vidura Wickremanayake, Member of Parliament,  Provincial Councillor

Wijewardene
Ref:

 Tudugalage Muhandiram Don Phillip Wijeywardene – Muhandiram + Dona Helena Dep Weerasinghe
 Don Richard Wijewardena (1886–1950) + Alice Meedeniya
 Ranjith Wijewardene + Ranjani Senanayake
 Ruwan Wijewardene (1975– ), Member of Parliament, Cabinet Minister
 Nalini Wijewardene + Esmond Wickremesinghe
 Ranil Wickremasinghe (1949– ), 9th President of Sri Lanka, Prime Minister of Sri Lanka, Government Minister, Member of Parliament
 Rani Wijewardene + George Gomes
Shalini Gomes + Themiya Loku Bandara Hurulle, Member of Parliament, Project Minister (Science and Technology), Member,(North Central Provincial Council), Director-General, Telecommunications Regulatory Commission of Sri Lanka (T.R.C.S.L.), Engineer (AC&R)
 Don Charles Wijewardene (1893-19??) + Vimala Wijewardene, Member of Parliament, Minister of Health 
 Padmini Wijewardene
 Rukmani Wijewardene + C Beligammana
 Ananda Wijewardene
 Don Walter T Wijewardene (1894–1939) + Anula Kalyanawathi Wijesinghe
 Upali Wijewardene (1938–1983) + Lakmini Ratwatte
 Anoja Devi Wijewardene (1933–2014) + Prof Stanley Wijesundera (1923 -1989)
 Shalitha Wijesundera, Member of the Western Provincial Council
 Don Phillip Alexander Wijewardene + Neeva Hulugalle
 Iranganie Wijewardene + Donald Joseph Wijewardene
 Nelun Kumari Wijewardene + William Tissa "Tommy" Ellawala
 Amari Wijewardene, Ambassador to the United Kingdom
 Don Edmund Wijewardene + Corin Amanda Jennings 
 Dr Phillip Revatha "Ray" Wijewardene – Chancellor University of Moratuwa + Seela de Mel 
 Anoma Wijewardene 
Roshini Wijewardene  
Mandy Wijewardene
 Agnes Helen Wijewardene + Eugene Wilfred Jayewardene (1874–1932), Chief Justice
 Junius Richard Jayewardene (1906–1996), President of Sri Lanka, Prime Minister of Sri Lanka, Government Minister, Member of Parliament, Member of State Council</ref>
 Hector Wilfred Jayewardene (1916–1990)
 Don Luis Wijewardene + Muriel Godamunne
 Donald Joseph Wijewardene + Iranganie Wijewardene
 Nelun Kumari Wijewardene + William Tissa "Tommy" Ellawala
 Amari Wijewardene – Ambassador to the United Kingdom
 Semitha Wijewardene + Victor Tennekoon, Chief Justice
Dayanthi Tennekoon + Dayantha Athulathmudali

Other members of the family include;
 Sir Henry De Mel
 J. H. Meedeniya Adigar

Wijeratne (Mirigama)
Mahendra Surasinghe Wijeratne, Government Minister, Member of Parliament
Udena Wijerathna, Provincial Councillor

Wijeyeratne
Ref:

 Gabrial Perera Wijeyeratne + Dona Catherina Wickremasinghe Jayasekera
 Sir Edwin Wijeyeratne (1889–1968), Cabnet Minister of Home Affairs and Rural Development, Senator, High Commissioner to Britain and India, one of Founding Members of the United National Party + Leela Pethiyagoda Kumarihamy ref>  Page 88 of Ferguson's Ceylon Directory 1950. Ferguson's Ceylon Directory 1950.</ref> 
 Tissa Wijeyeratne (1923–2002), politician, diplomat, Barrister-at-Law and businessman He was also Additional Secretary to the Ministry of External Affairs and Defence, Senior Advisor (Foreign Affairs) to the Prime Ministerref>IQBAL DAY CELEBRATION IN COLOMBO. Article specially written for the occasion by Mr. Tissa Wijeyeratne for the Ceylon Daily News of 21 April 1966.</ref> + Visakha Bulankulame
 Dr Nissanka Wijeyeratne (1924–2007), Diyawadana Nilame of the Sri Dalada Maligawa, Cabinet Minister of Education, Higher Education & Justice, Member of Parliament (1977–1989), Ambassador to the Soviet Union + Nita Dullewe
 Neranjan Wijeyeratne (1956– ), Diyawadana Nilame of the Sri Dalada Maligawa, Leader of the Opposition in the Kandy Municipal Council + Devika Mediwake
 Mano Wijeyeratne (1957–2011),  Government Minister of Plantation, Government Minister of Enterprise Development, Member of Parliament + Dushyanthi Wegodapola (first marriage) & Barathi Wijeratne (2nd marriage)
 Anuradha Dullewe Wijeyeratne,(1962– ), Acting Diyawadana Nilame of the Sri Dalada Maligawa, Provincial Councillor + Dayanganie Gunasekara

(also related to Senanayake, Ratwatte and Gopallawa)

Yapa Abeywardena
 Mahinda Yapa Abeywardena (1945– ), Government Minister of Agriculture, Chief Minister, Member of Parliament
 Sarath Yapa Abeywardena, Provincial Councillor
 Lakshman Yapa Abeywardena (1955– ), Government Minister, Member of Parliament 
 Pasanda Yapa Abeywardena, Politician, Provincial Councillor

References
 
 

Sri Lanka
 Families